Lorris is a commune in the Loiret department in north-central France.

Geography
It is in the southernmost part of the historical region Gâtinais. It is east of the Foret d'Orléans, and gave its name to the Massif de Lorris, the easternmost part of the Orléans forest.

Historical population

History
On 30 October 1242, the Peace of Lorris was signed by Raymond VII, Count of Toulouse and Louis IX, King of France.  The two men renewed the Treaty of Paris which they had already concluded on 12 April 1229.  The treaty put an end to the sufferings of the Albigeois.

Mayors of Lorris
 Louis Henri Prochasson
 Louis Lucien Naudin
 Constant Renard
 Constant Leturcq

See also
 Communes of the Loiret department

References

External links

Communes of Loiret